Arlington High School can refer to one of several American high schools:

Arlington High School (California), Riverside, California
Arlington High School (Illinois), Arlington Heights, Illinois
Arlington High School (Indiana), Indianapolis, Indiana
Arlington High School (Massachusetts), Arlington, Massachusetts
Arlington Senior High School, Saint Paul, Minnesota 
Arlington High School (Nebraska), Arlington, Nebraska
Arlington High School (New York), LaGrange, New York
Arlington High School (Ohio), Arlington, Ohio
Arlington High School (Oregon), Arlington, Oregon
Arlington High School (Tennessee), Arlington, Tennessee
Arlington High School (Texas), Arlington, Texas
Arlington High School (Washington), Arlington, Washington